Georgina Mary Crozier (born 16 November 1963) is an Australian politician. She has been a Liberal Party member of the Victorian Legislative Council since 2010, representing Southern Metropolitan Region. She currently serves as the Leader of the Opposition in the Legislative Council.

Under the Napthine Government, Crozier was appointed Parliamentary Secretary for Health. Following the 2014 Election, she was appointed Shadow Minister for Families and Children, Women and the Prevention of Family Violence, adding the Housing portfolio in September 2017.

After the 2018 Election, she was elected Deputy Leader of the Liberal Party in the Legislative Council and appointed Shadow Minister for Health and Ambulance Services.

Early life and education
Crozier was born in Coleraine, Victoria to Digby Crozier and Mary Jill Salter. She is one of four siblings. Her father was the Member for Western Province in the Victorian Legislative Council from 1973 to 1985 and Member for Portland from 1985 to 1988. He also served as a Minister in the Hamer and Thompson Governments. Her great-great-grandfather, John Crozier was a member of the South Australian Legislative Council from 1867 to 1887.

Crozier attended Geelong Grammar School before commencing general nurse training at the Alfred Hospital in 1983 and midwifery training at the Royal Women's Hospital in 1990. She holds a Bachelor of Nursing and Graduate Certificate in Diabetes Education from Deakin University and a Certificate in Management and Leadership from Swinburne University.

Professional career
After leaving school, Crozier worked as an Admin Assistant in 1982, before completing general nurse training between 1983 and 1986. She completed midwifery training in 1990 and subsequently worked as a midwife between 1991 and 1994. Following this she worked as a consultant and hospital supervisor at the Royal Women's Hospital between 1994 and 2000. She was an Executive Search/Recruitment Consultant between 2000 and 2006, a Business Manager between 2006 and 2008, and a Business Consultant from 2008 until her election in 2010.

Political career

Baillieu/ Napthine Government (2010-2014)
In 2010, Crozier was elected as the fourth member for Southern Metropolitan Region. Following the resignation of Ted Baillieu in March 2013, Dennis Napthine became Premier appointing Crozier as Parliamentary Secretary for Health.

Crozier chaired the Family and Community Development Committee's Inquiry into the Handling of Child Abuse by Religious and Other Organisations. Known as the Betrayal of Trust Inquiry, it uncovered shocking widespread and systemic abuse of children in multiple organisations dating back decades.

The Inquiry's 750-page report was tabled in November 2013 and recommended wide-sweeping legislative changes to both civil and criminal laws. The recommendations allowed victims to seek adequate compensation and recommended new criminal offences for those who turned a blind eye to sexual abuse. The inquiry was important in leading to legislative reforms which removed the statute of limitations on historical sexual abuse claims and was a catalyst for the Commonwealth Royal Commission into Institutional Responses to Child Sexual Abuse.

Opposition (2014-present)

Following Napthine's defeat at the 2014 Election, Matthew Guy was elected leader of the Victorian Liberal Party and Crozier was appointed Shadow Minister for Families and Children, Shadow Minister for Prevention of Family Violence, Shadow Minister for Women and Shadow Cabinet Secretary. In September 2017, she was appointed Shadow Minister for Housing ceding her positions as Shadow Minister for Women and Shadow Cabinet Secretary.

Following the 2018 Election, she was elected Deputy Leader of the Opposition and Deputy Leader of the Liberal Party in the Legislative Council, and appointed by Michael O'Brien as Shadow Minister for Health and Shadow Minister for Ambulance Services.

References

1963 births
Living people
Liberal Party of Australia members of the Parliament of Victoria
Members of the Victorian Legislative Council
Australian nurses
Deakin University alumni
Australian women nurses
People from Coleraine, Victoria
21st-century Australian politicians
21st-century Australian women politicians
Women members of the Victorian Legislative Council